Ephedra gerardiana (Gerard's jointfir, 山岭麻黄 shan ling ma huang) is a species of Ephedra, endemic to the mountains of Afghanistan, Bhutan, northern India, Nepal, Pakistan, Sikkim, Tajikistan, and Tibet. It is a perennial small shrub composed primarily of fibrous stalks, generally about 8 inches though sometimes growing to 24 inches in height, with small, yellow flowers followed by round, red, edible fruits. It is sometimes used as a stimulant, and in Ayurvedic medicine its tea is used as medicine for colds, coughs, bronchitis, asthma, and arthritis.

References

 Plants for a Future entry
 Entheology entry
 Plants of Tibet entry
 eFloras entry

External links

gerardiana
Soma (drink)